State Highway 76 (SH 76) is a State Highway in Kerala, India that starts in Kuranchery  and ends in Kechery. The highway is 12.838 km long.

The Route Map 
Kuranchery -Aryampadam - Mundathikode - Velur - Kechery

See also 
Roads in Kerala
List of State Highways in Kerala

References 

State Highways in Kerala
Roads in Thrissur district